The Salisbury Reds were an Interstate League baseball team based in Salisbury, Maryland, that played during the 1952 season. They were managed by Mike Blazo and Dick Porter and went 65–73.

Ducky Detweiler and Maurice Fisher played for them.

References

Baseball teams established in 1952
Defunct minor league baseball teams
Defunct baseball teams in Maryland
Defunct Interstate League teams
Cincinnati Reds minor league affiliates
Baseball teams disestablished in 1952